Venerini may refer to:

 Rosa Venerini, M.P.V., Saint (1656–1728), Italian foundress of the Religious Teachers Venerini (Italian: Maestre Pie Venerini)
 Religious Teachers Venerini, a pioneering institute of the Catholic Church for free public education of girls in Italy

See also 
 Veneri (disambiguation)